Tsukamurella pulmonis is a Gram-positive and aerobic bacterium from the genus Tsukamurella which has been isolated from the sputum from a patient with lung tuberculosis in Germany.

Characteristic as secondary metabolites production inducer by actinomycetes 

Tsukamurella pulmonis TP-B0596 induced production of anti-fungal 5aTHQs (5-Alkyl-1,2,3,4-tetrahydroquinolines) and anti-bacterial Streptoaminals (lipidic [5,5]-Spirohemiaminals) by Streptomyces sp. HEK616. T. pulmonis TP-B0596 was also shown to induce production of secondary metabolites; dracolactams by Micromonospora sp. HEK797, niizalactams by Streptomyces sp. NZ-6, chojalactones by Streptomyces sp. CJ-5, and Alchivemycin A by Streptomyces sp. S-522.

References

Further reading

External links
Type strain of Tsukamurella pulmonis at BacDive -  the Bacterial Diversity Metadatabase

Mycobacteriales
Bacteria described in 1996